Tempest is a synonym for a storm.

The Tempest is a play by William Shakespeare. 

Tempest or The Tempest may also refer to:

Arts and entertainment

Films
 The Tempest (1908 film), a British silent film
 The Tempest (1911 film), an American silent film
 Tempest (1928 film), a John Barrymore film
 The Tempest (1935 film), a Chinese film of the 1930s
 Tempest (1958 film), an Alberto Lattuada film
 The Tempest (1960 film), an American television film
 The Tempest (1963 film), an Australian television film
 The Tempest (1979 film), a film by Derek Jarman
 Tempest (1982 film), a Paul Mazursky film
 The Tempest (2010 film), a Julie Taymor film
 Tempest (2015 film), an animated short film
 The Tempest, a 1980 instalment of BBC Television Shakespeare directed by John Gorrie
 The Tempest, a 1998 made-for-TV film by Jack Bender
 Tempest, a 2012 film by Rob Curry and Anthony Fletcher

Literature
 Tempest (Bulis novel), a 1998 Doctor Who spin-off novel by Christopher Bulis
 Tempest (Denning novel), a 2006 Star Wars novel by Troy Denning
The Tempest (Dryden and D'Avenant play), a 1667 adaptation of Shakespeare's play by John Dryden and William d'Avenant
 The Tempest, a Star Trek: Deep Space Nine novel by Susan Wright
 The League of Extraordinary Gentlemen, Volume IV: The Tempest, part of the comic book series

Music

Classical music
 The Tempest (Sullivan), Arthur Sullivan's 1861 incidental music to Shakespeare's play
 The Tempest (Sibelius), Jean Sibelius's 1926 incidental music to Shakespeare's play 
 The Tempest (Tchaikovsky), an 1873 symphonic fantasy by Tchaikovsky
 "Tempest Sonata" or Piano Sonata No. 17, a piano sonata by Ludwig van Beethoven
 The Tempest, Op. 46 (1880), Symphonic Poem by Zdeněk Fibich

Operas
 The Tempest (Adès), a 2004 opera by Thomas Adès
 The Tempest (Hoiby), a 1986 opera by Lee Hoiby, after Shakespeare
 La Tempesta, a 1850 opera in Italian, by Fromental Halévy, after Shakespeare
 The Tempest (Smith), a 1756 opera by John Christopher Smith
 The Tempest, opus Z 631, a 1695 (?) semi-opera by Henry Purcell

Bands
 Tempest (Celtic rock band), an American Celtic rock band group
 Tempest (musician), electronic/alternative American rock band founded by Gabrielle Wortman
 Tempest (UK band), a British progressive rock group
 Tempest (South Korean band), a South Korean boy group
 Tempest (Christian rock band), an American Christian metal band
 The Tempest (band), a UK pop band

Albums
 Tempest (Balflare album) (2006)
 Tempest (Jesse Cook album) (1995)
 Tempest (Bob Dylan album) (2012)
 The Tempest (album), a 2007 album by Insane Clown Posse
 Tempest (Tussle album) (2012)

Songs
 "Tempest" (Deftones song) (2012)
 "Tempest" (Bob Dylan song) (2012)
 "Tempest", a song by Namie Amuro, part of a triple A-side single "Naked"/"Fight Together"/"Tempest"
 "Tempest", a 2007 song by Delta-S from Voyage to Isis
 "Tempest", a 2018 song by Low from Double Negative
 "Tempest", a 2018 song by Lucius from Nudes
 "The Tempest", a 2008 track by Mike Oldfield from Music of the Spheres
 "The Tempest", a 2008 track by Pendulum from In Silico
 "Tempest", a 2009 song by A Storm of Light from Forgive Us Our Trespasses
 "7empest" (pronounced "tempest"), a 2019 song by Tool from Fear Inoculum

Paintings
 The Tempest (Giorgione), a 1508 work by Giorgione
 The Tempest, a 1913–1914 painting by Oskar Kokoschka also known as The Bride of the Wind

Sculptures
 The Tempest (La Tempête) sculpture by Auguste Rodin
 The Tempest (Hebald), an outdoor sculpture by Milton Hebald in Central Park, New York, U.S.

Television
 "Tempest" (Smallville), a 2002 episode of Smallville
 The Tempest, a Dharma Initiative station on Lost

Other arts and entertainment
 Tempest (comics) (disambiguation), various comic book titles and characters
 Tempest (video game), a 1981 arcade game from Atari
 Tempest (Magic: The Gathering), an expansion to the Magic: The Gathering collectible card game 
 Tempest, a fictional starship in the video game Mass Effect: Andromeda

Military
 Hawker Tempest, a World War II–era British Royal Air Force fighter plane
 BAE Systems Tempest, a planned British Royal Air Force fighter plane
 HMS Tempest (H71), an R-class destroyer launched in 1917
 HMS Tempest (N86), a T-class submarine launched in 1941
 USS Tempest (1862), a Civil War gunboat
 USS Tempest (1869), a monitor renamed USS Yuma
 USS Tempest (PC-2),  a Cyclone-class coastal patrol ship launched in 1992
 SD Tempest, a tugboat supporting the United Kingdom's Naval Service
 Operation Tempest, a World War II operation of the Polish Home Army
 Tempest, a variant of the Centurion tank used in Singapore
 Tempest MPV, a British army version of the Cougar military vehicle

People
 Tempest (surname)
 Tempest Anderson (1846–1913), English ophthalmic surgeon, amateur photographer and vulcanologist
 Tempestt Bledsoe (born 1973), American actress
 Tempest DuJour, American drag queen
 Tempest Storm, stage name of American exotic dancer, burlesque dancer, and film actress Annie Blanche Banks (1928–2021)

Transportation
 Tempest (ship), a steamship of the Anchor Line that vanished in 1857
 Tempest (keelboat)
 Moyes Tempest, a glider produced by Moyes Microlights
 Pontiac Tempest, an automobile produced by General Motors from 1961 to 1970 and 1987 to 1991
 VinFast Tempesr, an electric scooter manufactured by VinFast

Other uses
 Tempest (codename), a standard of shielding for wires and computers used by the U.S. and other governments
 Tempest Peak, a mountain in Ross Dependency, Antarctica
 Tempest Stele, a stele erected by Egyptian Pharaoh Ahmose I c. 1550 BC
 The Tempest (media company), digital media startup, founded 2016
 Tempest, a brand operated by the department store Menarys
 Tempest, the watermelon flavor of the chewing gum 5 in Australia and New Zealand

See also
 Der Sturm (opera), a German-language opera by Frank Martin
 
 
 The Tempests (disambiguation)